The Miami Miners were a Minor League Baseball team that represented Miami, Arizona in the Arizona State League  from 1928 to 1930. The Globe-Miami Browns would succeed them in 1947.

External links
Baseball Reference

Baseball teams established in 1928
Baseball teams disestablished in 1930
1928 establishments in Arizona
1930 disestablishments in Arizona
Professional baseball teams in Arizona
Defunct Arizona State League teams
Defunct baseball teams in Arizona
Gila County, Arizona
Arizona State League teams